Lemuel John Tweedie (November 30, 1849 – July 15, 1917) was a Canadian politician.

His law partner in Chatham, New Brunswick for a time was Richard Bedford Bennett, later Prime Minister of Canada; and for a time Max Aitken was his office boy.

A former supporter of the federal Conservatives, he joined the Liberal Cabinet of New Brunswick Premier Andrew George Blair serving as Surveyor-General and Provincial Secretary in successive Liberal governments.  Tweedie became the tenth premier of New Brunswick in 1900 and led the party to a large majority government in the 1903 election.

Tweedie's government allowed women to be admitted to the practice of law in 1906 and supported the development of hydroelectric power at Grand Falls. He also created a Workers' Compensation board and successfully lobbied the federal government to increase subsidies to the province including payment for railway expansion. He led the government for seven years before becoming the 12th Lieutenant Governor of New Brunswick, holding that position until 1912.

A supporter of educational institutions, Tweedie personally donated academic prizes for students. He served on the Board of Governors of the University of New Brunswick, Mount Allison University, plus the Halifax School for the Blind.

Lemuel Tweedie died in 1917 at age sixty-seven in his home town of Chatham and was buried in the Riverside Cemetery. His son Frederick served as a member of the provincial assembly.

References 

Biography at the Dictionary of Canadian Biography Online
 Biography, Government of New Brunswick

External links 
 

1849 births
1917 deaths
Lawyers in New Brunswick
New Brunswick Liberal Association MLAs
Members of the Executive Council of New Brunswick
Premiers of New Brunswick
Lieutenant Governors of New Brunswick
Canadian Presbyterians
People from Northumberland County, New Brunswick